Pascal Miézan Aka (3 April 1959 – 31 July 2006) was an Ivorian professional footballer who played as a midfielder.

Career
Miézan spent most of his career playing for Abidjan side Africa Sports. He also had a spell with Belgian First Division side Lierse.

Miézan made several appearances for the Ivory Coast national football team, including three appearances at the 1984 African Cup of Nations finals. He also played for Ivory Coast national under-20 football team at the 1977 FIFA World Youth Championship in Tunisia.

In 2006, he was selected by CAF as one of the best 200 African football players of the last 50 years.

References

External links

1959 births
2006 deaths
People from Gagnoa
Association football midfielders
Ivorian footballers
Ivory Coast under-20 international footballers
Ivory Coast international footballers
1980 African Cup of Nations players
1986 African Cup of Nations players
1984 African Cup of Nations players
1988 African Cup of Nations players
1990 African Cup of Nations players
Belgian Pro League players
Africa Sports d'Abidjan players
Lierse S.K. players
Ivorian expatriate footballers
Expatriate footballers in Belgium